Adam Nicholas Senior (born 20 January 2002) is an English professional footballer play as a defender for Halifax Town on loan from Bolton Wanderers. He can play at both a centre-back and right-back.

Career
Born in Bolton, Senior joined the youth academy of hometown club Bolton Wanderers, the club he grew up supporting. On 31 August 2019, following major financial troubles that had forced the club to utilise youth players, Senior made his first team debut in a 5–0 away loss against Gillingham. He signed his first  professional deal with Bolton Wanderers on 15 May 2020, penning a one-year deal. He scored his first goal on 6 October in a 2–1 defeat against Shrewsbury Town in the EFL Trophy.
On May 19, 2021, Bolton revealed he was contracted for the 2021–2022 season.

On 1 October 2021, he joined Ashton United on loan for a month. He made his debut a day later, starting in a 1–0 defeat to Warrington Town. He scored his first goal for Ashton on 9 October, earning a point for them in a 1–1 draw against Gainsborough Trinity. The loan was extended for a month on 3 November. A week later however, Bolton recalled him from his loan and sent him on loan to York City for a month instead. He made his debut a day later, helping York get a clean sheet in a 0–0 draw against Curzon Ashton. He was recalled from the loan on 9 December and started the next Bolton match two days later in a 1–0 loss against Accrington Stanley. On 25 January 2022, he joined Chorley on loan until the end of the season. He made his debut the same day and was named Man of the Match in a 2–2 draw against Fylde. On 3 March, he was recalled from his loan to provide extra defensive competition due to the absence of Gethin Jones. On 3 May the club confirmed that they had offered him a new contract which he signed on 14 June. On 8 November 2022, he joined Telford United on loan for a month. On 13 December, it was extended until 2 January. He impressed during this loan spell, playing a total of 9 times, with Telford wanting to extend it even further — though Bolton instead decided to recall him. Two weeks later, he joined National League side Halifax Town on a month's loan which was later extended for another month.

Career statistics

Notes

References

 

2002 births
Living people
Association football defenders
English footballers
Bolton Wanderers F.C. players
Ashton United F.C. players
York City F.C. players
Chorley F.C. players
AFC Telford United players
English Football League players
National League (English football) players
Northern Premier League players
FC Halifax Town players
Footballers from Bolton